When the Serbs in Banat rose up against the Ottomans in 1594, using the portrait of Saint Sava on their war flags, the Ottomans retaliated by incinerating the relics of St. Sava on the Vračar plateau in Belgrade. Grand Vizier Koca Sinan Pasha, the main commander of the Ottoman army, ordered for the relics to be brought from Mileševa to Belgrade, where he set them on fire on 27 April. Monk Nićifor of the Fenek monastery wrote that "there was great violence carried out against the clergy and devastation of monasteries". The Ottomans sought to symbolically and really, set fire to the Serb determination of freedom, which had become growingly noticeable. The event, however, sparked an increase in rebel activity, until the suppression of the uprising in 1595. It is believed that his left hand was saved; it is currently held at Mileševa.

The burning of Saint Sava's relics is a Serbian Orthodox religious holiday venerated on 27 April (10 May Gregorian). Archbishop Sava founded the Serbian Orthodox Church, Serbian ecclesiastical law and national literature. He was canonized as a miracle-worker and his religious cult was assimilated into folk beliefs in Ottoman times. The veneration of his relics created tension between Serbs and the occupying Ottomans. In 1774, Sava was proclaimed the patron saint of all Serbs. In the 19th century the cult was revived in the context of nationalism with the prospect of independence from the Ottomans, "representing and reproducing powerful images of a national Golden Age, of national reconciliation and unification, and of martyrdom for the church and nation". After Serbia gained full independence, a cathedral dedicated to the saint was planned, part of modernization plans of Belgrade. Although the construction board for the church was established in 1895, the construction of the winning concept, based on Gračanica and Hagia Sophia, began in 1935. Construction stopped during World War II and the Communist rule, only to be restarted after permission in 1984; as of 2018 the church has been finished and is the second largest Orthodox Church in the world. The site where Saint Sava's relics were burnt, the Vračar plateau, became the new grounds of the National Library of Serbia and the Church of Saint Sava dedicated to the saint, in the 20th century. From its location, the church dominates Belgrade's cityscape, and has become a national symbol.

References

Sources
Books

 
 
 

Journals

External links
 Охридски пролог за 27. април (10. мај) 
 Ломача за Светог Саву упаљена на Ташмајдану („Вечерње новости“, 25. септембар 2013) 

Saint Sava
Persecution of Serbs
16th century in Serbia
1594 in Europe
1595 in Europe
Christian relics
16th-century fires
History of the Serbian Orthodox Church
Ottoman Serbia
Events in Belgrade
Vračar